The W. Ben Hunt Cabin is a Rustic-styled log cabin built by graphic artist W. Ben Hunt in 1924 in Hales Corners, Wisconsin, United States. It was added to the National Register of Historic Places in 2008.

History
The cabin was built by artist and author W. Ben Hunt in his backyard. It started as an homage to his grandmother's cabin, where he spent part of his childhood, but it developed into a Rustic Style design. Hunt used the cabin to work on his art and his writings. In 1940, he added onto the structure. The cabin has since been moved from its original location to its current one and transformed into a museum.

References

External links
 Ben Hunt Cabin - Hales Corners Historical Society

Houses completed in 1924
Houses on the National Register of Historic Places in Wisconsin
Museums in Milwaukee County, Wisconsin
Rustic architecture in Wisconsin
Houses in Milwaukee County, Wisconsin
Historic house museums in Wisconsin
National Register of Historic Places in Milwaukee County, Wisconsin